The 2019 Iwate gubernatorial election was held on 8 September 2019 to elect the next governor of Iwate.

Candidates 
Takuya Tasso*, backed by the opposition parties CDP, JCP, SDP, DPFP.
Atsushi Oikawa back by LDP and Komeito. He is a former local assemblyman for LDP.

Results

References

2019 elections in Japan
Iwate gubernational elections
September 2019 events in Japan